The General George Patton Museum of Leadership is a publicly accessible museum on Fort Knox, Kentucky, dedicated to the memory and life lessons of General George S. Patton, Jr., and the continuing education of Junior Army leaders in the U.S. Army and in particular the Army Reserve Officers' Training Corps. The museum is administered by U.S. Army Cadet Command, Fort Knox and U.S. Army Training and Doctrine Command as part of the Center for Military History.

History
The museum began as housing and storage for many captured enemy military vehicles and equipment sent to Fort Knox during WWII by Patton's Third United States Army for study. Following Patton's death in 1945, many of his personal military vehicles and equipment began to accumulate there, leading to the eventual establishment of 'The Patton Museum' in 1948. This makes it one of the longest continually operating Museums in the United States Army's Center For Military History Army Museum Enterprise. The museum collection was eventually moved to the present 45,000 sq. ft building constructed in 1972 and renamed the 'Patton Museum of Cavalry and Armor'. Further improvements and updates were completed in 1992 all without cost to the U.S. Government by the privately funded Cavalry and Armor Foundation, now called the Patton Museum Foundation. The museum was renamed a third time to the 'General George Patton Museum of Leadership' following the 2010 departure of the United States Army Armor School to Fort Benning as part of the Base Realignment and Closure program. The Museum's previously large collection of armored vehicles followed the Armor school to Fort Benning, to become today's National Armor and Cavalry Museum. With this major shift in the Patton Museum's collection, its mission changed to Junior Officer developmental training with a focus on the Army's ROTC and JROTC Programs whose U.S. Headquarters has been based at Fort Knox since 2012. Using the legacy and remaining personal collection of Generals George S. Patton Jr and George S. Patton IV, the Museum continues to train the Army's future and current generation of leaders.

Operating hours
Museum entry is free and open to the public Tuesday to Saturday, 9am to 430pm (Eastern Standard Time) excluding federal holidays. As of 2021 the Museum is publicly accessible from highway 31W and is part of Fort Knox but does not require entry onto the military installation to access it.

Exhibits
The museum possesses a collection of over 3,000 artifacts with more than 600 personal items belonging to the late General Patton and his family to include General Patton's famed ivory-handled pistols (a Colt Single Action Army .45 and Smith & Wesson .357), his custom-built World War II living quarters van, 1938 Cadillac touring car and many more. Other featured artifacts include a variety of captured enemy small arms and equipment from Patton's service in the Mexican Punitive Expedition, World War One, and World War Two and from his son, George S. Patton IV's service in the Korean and Vietnam Wars.

Several props are on exhibit from the 1970 film Patton as used by leading actor George C. Scott such as the prop pistols carried and parade helmet worn by Scott in the famous opening sequence.

Perhaps best known prior to 2012 for its large collection of tanks, many of these larger items accompanied the move of the Armor school and are now part of the National Armor and Cavalry Museum Collection at Fort Benning, GA. As of 2022 several tanks and unique armor pieces remain on display at the museum to include an M10 Tank Destroyer, M7 Priest, M4A3E8 and "Firefly" Sherman Tanks, UH-1D "Huey" Helicopter, and German StuG III armored vehicle recovered from a swamp in Russia in 1995. Many of these vehicles are used to teach lessons at the Junior Officer Level with a focus on small unit leadership. An E-One fire truck, "FOAM161" of the Fort Myer Fire Department which was damaged in the September 11th Attacks is also currently on exhibit.

In 2012, one of the last remaining WWII barracks buildings on Fort Knox was relocated to the Museum grounds and gradually restored using donated funds. The barracks opened for public exhibition in May 2021. The two-story wooden building built ca.1940 housed a 63-man platoon with separate living quarters for NCOs. The entire ground floor including restored latrine and shower area is accessible to the general public and houses several displays depicting life at Fort Knox from the 1940s to 1970s.

See also
 George S. Patton Jr.
 George S. Patton IV
 Patton Monument (West Point)
 General George S. Patton Memorial Museum, Chiriaco Summit, California
 United States Army Ordnance Museum
 List of attractions and events in the Louisville metropolitan area

References

External links

 

Museums in the Louisville metropolitan area
Military and war museums in Kentucky
Patton
Museums in Hardin County, Kentucky
United States Army museums
Tank museums
Fort Knox